XX World Rhythmic Gymnastics Championships were held in Budapest, the capital of Hungary, June 19–23, 1996. Without individual-AA, qualification were via the results of the World Championships 1995 in Vienna. A gymnasts was only allowed to start in 2 finals.

Medal winners

Individual

Individual Ball

Individual Clubs

Individual Rope

Individual Ribbon

Groups

Groups All-Around

Groups 3 Balls + 2 Ribbons Final

Groups 5 Hoops Final

References

Rhythmic Gymnastics World Championships
Rhythmic Gymnastics Championships
International gymnastics competitions hosted by Hungary
1996 in gymnastics